Halīl River or HalīlRood (also Haliri River, known as the Kharaw or ZarDasht River in its upper reaches) is a river stretching for some  running in the Baft, Jiroft and Kahnuj districts of Kerman Province, Iran. 

The climate of the Halil Rud or Halilrood (Rud or Rood means "river" in Persian) basin is extremely hot in summer and of moderate temperature in winter.
 in August 1933.

The Halil riverbanks are subject to periodical flooding, including the historical flood which destroyed Jiroft in ca. AD 1000, and one in 1993.

Archaeology 

The basin contains the sites of the Bronze Age Jiroft culture. Near the river is the village of Halil Rud (not far from the city of Jiroft); the area nearby "became famous between 2002/2003 [when news of] thousands of confiscated burial goods, especially elaborated carved chlorite vessels from the necropolises of Halil Rud" were released to public.  

Since February 2003, archaeologist have recovered a wealth of artifacts from the necropolis which they had named Mahtoutabad. The two nearby mounds were also excavated: Konar Sandal South and North. A 2013 research paper about the South mound states that work during 2006 to 2009 "revealed the remains of three successive settlements dating to the fourth millennium BC".

Excavation re-commenced in 2014 and revealed art works of "complexity and beauty" and artifacts that proved that the society had several writing systems. According to National Geographic, the content of the mounds is significant:They turned out to contain the remains of two major architectural complexes. The northern mound included a cult building, while in the southern one were the remains of a fortified citadel. At the foot of the mounds, buried under many feet of sediment, were the remains of smaller buildings. It's believed that the two mounds had once formed part of a unified urban settlement that stretched many miles across the plateau ... [artifacts] "have been dated to between 2500 and 2200 B.C. [They are said to be evidence of] the "development of a complex civilization".

References

Literature
Encyclopædia Iranica

Rivers of Kerman Province
Landforms of Kerman Province
Jiroft culture